14th Lux Style Awards

Official Poster 
September 30, 2015 
 
Host: 
Fawad Khan
Mahira Khan
Yasir Hussain

Venue: 
Expo Center, Karachi

Film 
Na Maloom Afraad

Television Play: 
Pyaray Afzal

Album: 
Dareeche  
 
←13th Lux Style Awards 15th→

The 14th Lux Style Awards ceremony, presented by Lux to honor the fashion, music, films and Pakistani television of 2014 was held on 30 September 2015 beginning at 8:30 p.m PST. For this year ceremony no nominations were made for terrestrial and satellite categories in Television section as no satisfied entries for respective portfolios were submitted.

Winners and Nominees
Following are the nominees announced by LUX on 16 July 2015 in 24 categories. Due to huge criticism and outrage on the awards, the nominations were revised and reannounced. Pyaray Afzal leads with total of seven nomination in five categories of Television section. Saleh Araf became the youngest winner of Best Actress category, as well as Pyare Afzal won a record breaking television awards in all of its categories for which it was nominated.

Winners are listed first in boldface:

Film

Television

Retrieved and New Nominations
After the announcement of nominations Hum TV deducted it's nominations and LSAs revised the nominations. The new nominations included:
 Aasmanon Pay Likha for Best TV Play 
 Faysal Quraishi (Bashar Momin) for Best TV Actor 
 Azfar Rehman (New York Se New Karachi) for Best TV Actor 
 Zanjabeel Asim Shah (Marasim) for Best TV Writer
Nominees that were deducted by Hum TV:
 Sakina Samo (Muhabbat Subha Ka Sitara Hai) for Best TV Director 
 Mekaal Zulfiqar (Muhabbat Subha Ka Sitara Hai) for Best TV Actor 
 Noman Ijaz (Zindagi Teray Bina) for Best TV Actor 
 Sarmad Sehbai (Laa) for Best TV Writer 
 Momina Duraid (Sadqay Tumhare) for Best Original Soundtrack

Music

Fashion

Controversies 
Due to outrage and huge criticism on LUX for not nominating Bashar Momin, one of the most popular play of that year, in any of the category, nominations were revised by the jury after which the play was nominated with some other nominations were also add. However, the nominations belong to Hum TV were excluded on the team's own request. The reason was probably that last year Zindagi Gulzar Hai did not sweep all the categories as Humsafar did in 12th Lux Style Awards, so it was decided to not submit any portfolio by the network.

Honorary awards

 Lifetime Achievement Award

 Syed Noor

See also

 3rd Hum Awards

References

External links 

 Lux Style Awards official website

Lux Style Awards ceremonies
2014 film awards
2014 television awards
2014 music awards
Lux
Lux
Lux